SIMILE (Semantic Interoperability of Metadata and Information in unLike Environments) was a joint research project run by the World Wide Web Consortium (W3C), Massachusetts Institute of Technology Libraries and MIT CSAIL and funded by the Andrew W. Mellon Foundation. The project ran from 2003 to August 2008. It focused on developing tools to increase the interoperability of disparate digital collections. Much of SIMILE's technical focus is oriented towards Semantic Web technology and standards such as Resource Description Framework (RDF).

History
SIMILE stands for Semantic Interoperability of Metadata and Information in unLike Environments. It was born out of DSpace, the open source system digital repository for scholarly materials developed at MIT. DSpace, which is now used at a number of research institutions, archives scholarly publications, making it possible to federate the collections of the various holding libraries and combining materials across disciplines. 
The SIMILE project grew from the need to support metadata schemas in research materials which has been described in various domain-specific ways, and provides a capability beyond Dublin Core. 
The challenge for DSpace and other digital libraries is to assist communities in dealing with different schemes, vocabularies, ontologies and metadata and to provide research services to their users.

SIMILE projects

See also
 Haystack, a related project from the MIT which mostly concentrates on personal information management
 Freebase

References
 Butler, Mark H., Gilbert, John, Seaborne, Andy, Smathers, Kevin 2004, Data conversion, extraction and record linkage using XML and RDF tools in Project SIMILE. Digital Media Systems Laboratories HP Laboratories, Bristol, United Kingdom.
 Huynh, D., Mazzocchi, S., & Karger, D. Piggy Bank: experience the semantic web inside your web browser, MIT Computer Science and Artificial Intelligence Laboratory, Cambridge, MA.
 Mazzocchi, S., Garland, S. & Lee, R. 2005, SIMILE: practical metadata for the semantic web, O'Reilly xml.com, 26 Jan.
 Project SIMILE: Semantic Interoperability of Metadata and Information in unLike Environments 2005, Massachusetts Institute of Technology, July, Massachusetts, United States.

External links
 SIMILE Project
 An independent "spin-off" from the SIMILE project
 W3C Semantic Web Activity

Semantic Web
Massachusetts Institute of Technology